José W. F. Valle (born June 2, 1953) is a Spanish-Brazilian physicist.

Biography
Born in Brazil, he earned a PhD in Theoretical Physics from Syracuse University (New York, 1982). In January 1983 he joined the Rutherford Appleton Laboratory, Oxfordshire, UK, as a Research Associate, where he got married with a Spanish geneticist.  In 1986 he moved to Spain, joining as a visiting professor at the Autonomous University of Barcelona, and subsequently IFIC (Instituto de Física Corpuscular)

at the University of Valencia in 1987. He is a Full Professor at the Spanish Council for Scientific Research CSIC. He is known for his numerous contributions to theoretical astroparticle and high energy physics, especially neutrino physics.

Valle has contributed significantly to the modern theory of neutrino mass. In a groundbreaking work with Joseph Schechter  he has provided the first exhaustive discussion of the various mechanisms of neutrino mass generation (including the variants of the seesaw mechanism). The same authors also formulated the Schechter-Valle theorem 
demonstrating that an observation of neutrinoless double beta decay will necessarily imply neutrinos to be Majorana fermions and vice versa. He also contributed to the correct interpretation of  
the oscillations of solar and atmospheric neutrinos which led to the physics Nobel Prize 2015 awarded to 
Arthur B. McDonald and Takaaki Kajita. The discovery of neutrino masses and oscillations can be considered as the only firm indication of the incompleteness of the Standard Model of particle physics with important consequences also for astrophysics and cosmology.

Honors
 Spanish Iberdrola Science & Technology Prize for Theoretical Physics in 1999
 Humboldt Prize in 2002
 Medal of the Mexican Physical Society, 2014.
 Premio México de Ciencia y Tecnología 2018

Press
 CERN Courier note on the occasion of the Humboldt Research Award, April-2003
 An Interview to Spanish newspaper [El Pais, October 2006.
  An article on "Neutrino detection" in Spanish newspaper Publico,  May 2008, download here.

Publications

Authored a particle physics textbook Neutrinos in High Energy and Astroparticle Physics which has been reviewed by the CERN Courier

Here is his publication profile  from the INSPIRE-HEP High Energy Physics database.

References

External links
 Citation summary profile from Inspire Energy Physics database 
 
 Particle theorists citation ranking from Spires HEP database (2004).
 AHEP Group official site
 IFIC-Institut de Física Corpuscular official site
  Items by or about José Valle in the Library of Congress catalogue
  Items by or about José Valle in the German National Library catalogue
 Cited in the popular science book The Perfect Wave: With Neutrinos at the Boundary of Space and Time, by Heinrich Päs, Harvard University Press
 Receiving Premio México de Ciencia y Tecnología 2018, on December 9, 2019, Mexico, DF.

See also
 List of theoretical physicists

Particle physicists
Weak interaction physicists
Brazilian physicists
Humboldt Research Award recipients
Spanish physicists
Living people
1953 births